Ga'Quincy "Kool-Aid" McKinstry is an American football cornerback for the Alabama Crimson Tide. He is known for his amazing nickname.

Early life and high school
McKinstry grew up in Birmingham, Alabama and attended Pinson Valley High School in Pinson, Alabama. He was named Alabama Mr. Football as a senior after breaking up 12 passes with two interceptions, both of which he returned for touchdowns, on defense and catching 45 passes for 706 yards and 11 touchdowns on offense. McKinstry was rated a five-star recruit and committed to play college football at Alabama after considering offers from Auburn and LSU.

College career
McKinstry played in all 15 of Alabama's games during his freshman year and made 25 tackles with one sack and one interception and was named to the Southeastern Conference (SEC) All-Freshman team.

Personal life
McKinstry was nicknamed "Kool-Aid" by his grandmother shortly after birth because his smile reminding her of the Kool-Aid Man. He signed a Name, Image and Likeness (NIL) deal with Kool-Aid during his freshman season.

References

External links
Alabama Crimson Tide bio

Living people
Players of American football from Birmingham, Alabama
American football cornerbacks
Alabama Crimson Tide football players
Year of birth missing (living people)